Alexander Bruce (14 July 1917) was a New Zealand engineer, trade unionist, baker, gold miner and local politician. He was born in Aberdeen, Aberdeenshire, Scotland.

References

1839 births
1917 deaths
Local politicians in New Zealand
New Zealand trade unionists
New Zealand engineers
New Zealand miners
Scottish emigrants to New Zealand
19th-century New Zealand engineers
19th-century New Zealand politicians